Berke Akçam (born 10 April 2002) is a Turkish athlete who specializes in the 400 m hurdles. He was the gold medallist at the World Athletics U20 Championships in 2021.

References

External links 
 

Turkish male hurdlers
2002 births
Living people
World Athletics U20 Championships winners
21st-century Turkish people